Kamysty, known as Kamyshnoye until 1997, is a village in the Kostanay Region, Kazakhstan. It is the administrative center of Kamysty District and of the Sverdlovsk Rural District (KATO code - 394830100). Population:

Geography
The village is located by lake Dosaykopa (Досайқопа),  to the southeast of Kostanay city, the regional capital.

References

Populated places in Kostanay Region